Addison Road may refer to:
 Addison Road, London
Addison Road railway station, an Underground and Overground station more commonly called Kensington (Olympia) station
 Addison Road (band), an American Christian alternative pop/rock band
Addison Road (album)
 Addison Road station, a Washington Metro station in Prince George's County, Maryland

See also
 Addiston Road, former grounds of Harchester United F.C.